Eldon Wellington Heywood Mason (June 21, 1902 – October 2, 1990) was an American college football player and coach. He served as the head football coach at Bemidji State Normal School—now known as Bemidji State University—in Bemidji, Minnesota from 1928 to 1930, compiling a record of 8–9–3. Mason was also the head basketball coach at Bemidji State from 1928 to 1931, tallying a mark of 17–17. Mason died of cancer on October 8, 1990, in St. Louis, Missouri.

Head coaching record

Football

References

External links
 

1902 births
1990 deaths
Basketball coaches from Minnesota
Bemidji State Beavers athletic directors
Bemidji State Beavers football coaches
Bemidji State Beavers men's basketball coaches
Deaths from cancer in Missouri
Minnesota Golden Gophers football players
New Hampshire Wildcats football players
Players of American football from Minneapolis
Sports coaches from Minneapolis